Metapolygnathus is an extinct genus of platform conodonts.

Synonyms 
Mazzaella is a new genus that also includes Metapolygnathus baloghi Kovacs (1977).

Use in stratigraphy 
The top of the Carnian or the base of the Norian stages (Late Triassic) begin at the base of the conodont biozones of Metapolygnathus communisti and Metapolygnathus primitius. A global reference profile for the base (a GSSP) had in 2009 not yet been appointed.

References

External links 

 
 

Conodont genera
Late Triassic fish
Triassic conodonts